Ypthima philomela, the baby fivering or baby fourring, is a species of Satyrinae butterfly found in Asia.

References

philomela
Butterflies of Asia
Butterflies of Indochina
Butterflies described in 1763
Taxa named by Carl Linnaeus